The Blériot XIII was an experimental passenger-carrying aircraft built during 1910 by Recherches Aéronautique Louis Blériot. It is notable for setting a record for passenger carrying flights, and was probably intended as a developmental aircraft for the Blériot XXIV Limousine.

Design
The Type XIII differed considerably from the series of tractor configuration monoplanes with which Louis Blériot is generally associated.  It was a high-wing pusher configuration monoplane, with the  Gnome engine inset into the trailing edge of the square-tipped wing, which had inset ailerons and was braced by a deep wire-braced truss underneath. The wing was mounted on a conventional wire-braced wooden box girder using six uprights and a pair of substantial diagonal members to transmit the thrust of the engine to the main airframe.  The pilot sat immediately in front of the wing leading edge, with the four passengers seated two by two behind him.  A front-mounted elevator was carried on two pairs of V-booms, and a fixed lifting horizontal surface with a rectangular rudder above it was mounted on top of the rear of the fuselage structure. The main undercarriage consisted of a pair of wheels each in a trailing arm structure which was free to slide on upright tubes mounted outboard of the fuselage, and sprung by bungee cords.

Operational history
On  2 February 1911 Léon Lemartin broke a world record by flying the Type XIII with eight passengers. Later, he succeeded in flying the aircraft with as many as twelve other people on board. Lamartin's load for his eight-passenger list was reported to have been , so his record would not have been ratified under the new rules.

The Blériot XXIV

In late 1911 Blériot produced an aircraft of similar configuration which had been built to the order of Henri Deutsch de la Meurthe,  the Blériot XXIV "Limousine" (also referred to as the Bleriot Aeronef and the Bleriot Berline), and it is probable that the Type XIII was intended as a developmental aircraft for this machine. This aircraft featured  an enclosed cabin with mica windows for the passengers, built by the Rothchild coachbuilding company, with the pilot sitting in front of it, his only protection being a small conical windshield attached to the front outrigger cross-bracing wires. A speaking tube was provided to allow the passengers to communicate with the pilot.<ref name=aerocar>The First "Aerocar"[[Flight International|Flight]] 25 November 1911</ref>  It differed considerably from the Type XIII in its constructional details. The wings had elliptical ends, similar to those of the Blériot XI and used wing warping for lateral control. They were conventionally braced using wires, those above the wing being connected to a cabane made up of a pair of inverted V-struts with a longitudinal tube connecting the apexes: under this was a large teardrop shaped fuel tank. The tail surfaces were mounted of four wire-braced booms, and the front elevator on four curved booms attached to the front of the cabin. It was initially powered by a  Gnome 14 Omega-Omega, which was later replaced by a  Gnome 14 Gamma-Gamma.

Specifications (Type XIII)

Notes

References

Elliott, Brian A. Blériot: Herald of an Age Stroud: Tempus, 2000. 
Opdycke, Leonard E French Aeroplanes Before the Great War'' Atglen, PA: Schiffer, 1999 

Single-engined pusher aircraft
High-wing aircraft
Canard aircraft
Rotary-engined aircraft
Aircraft first flown in 1911